The 1968 United States Senate election in Arizona took place on November 5, 1968. Incumbent Democratic U.S. Senator Carl Hayden did not run for reelection to an eighth term, with his longtime staff member Roy Elson running as the Democratic Party nominee to replace him. Elson was defeated by a wide margin, however, by former U.S. Senator and 1964 Republican presidential nominee Barry Goldwater. Prior to Goldwater's election, the seat had been held for decades by the Democratic Party under Carl Hayden, but after this election remained in Republican Party control continuously for 52 years, until Democrat Mark Kelly won in the 2020 special election.

Elson had previously challenged U.S. Senator Paul Fannin in 1964, when Goldwater vacated his seat in order to run for President against Lyndon B. Johnson.

Democratic primary

Candidates
 Roy Elson, staff member to Senator Carl Hayden, 1964 Democratic nominee for U.S. Senate
 Bob Kennedy, State Treasurer of Arizona
 Dick Herbert, Corporation Commissioner

Results

Republican primary

Candidates
 Barry Goldwater, former U.S. Senator, 1964 Republican Party nominee for President of the United States

General election

See also 
 United States Senate elections, 1968

References

1968
Arizona
United States Senate
1968